Paduka Sri Sultan Zainal Rashid Mu'adzam Shah II ibni Almarhum Sultan Ahmad Tajuddin Mukarram Shah (4 September 1857 – 22 September 1881) was the 25th Sultan of Kedah. He reigned from 1879 to 1881. He was the son of Sultan Ahmad Tajuddin Mukarram Shah with Wan Tan binti Almarhum Luang Nik Abidin. He married Tengku Mariam binti Almarhum Tengku Ziauddin and had only a princess, Tengku Aishah.

Tunku Aishah married the Sultan of Langkat, Sultan Abdul Aziz Abdul Djalil Rahmat Shah.

He was poisoned and died during detention in Ligor, Nakhon Si Thammarat on 22 September 1881 and was succeeded by his brother Sultan Abdul Hamid Halim Shah I, and then by his half-brother as, Sultan Abdul Hamid Halim Shah II in 1881.

External links
 List of Sultans of Kedah

1857 births
1881 deaths
Deaths by poisoning
19th-century murdered monarchs
19th-century Sultans of Kedahhttps://kedahligor.blogspot.com/?m=1